Latimeriidae is the only extant family of coelacanths, an ancient lineage of lobe-finned fish. It contains two extant species in the genus Latimeria, found in deep waters off the coasts of southern Africa and east-central Indonesia. In addition, several fossil genera are known from the Mesozoic of Europe, the Middle East, and the southeastern United States, dating back to the Triassic.

The latimeriids are thought to have always been an exclusively marine group. They may have originated in the western Tethys Sea, as many of the earliest species are known from areas that it formerly covered. The largest known member of the family, the Late Cretaceous Megalocoelacanthus, may have reached 4.5 metres in length. The Latimeriidae are thought to be the sister group to the Mawsoniidae, an extinct family of coelacanths that survived until the Late Cretaceous, inhabited both freshwater and marine habitats, and contained some very large species. Together, both comprise the suborder Latimerioidei.

Cladogram after Toriño et al. 2021.

References 

Extant Triassic first appearances
Fish families
Taxa named by Lev Berg